Saint-Germain-les-Paroisses is a commune in the Ain department in eastern France.

Population

Language 
The most commonly spoken language is French

See also 
Communes of the Ain department

References

Communes of Ain
Ain communes articles needing translation from French Wikipedia